Comertown is an unincorporated community in northeastern Sheridan County, Montana, United States. It was founded in 1913. Comertown is centered at  (48.8969706, -104.2499432) and located at an altitude of 2,270 feet (692 m).

Although the land around Comertown attracted numerous homesteaders during the first years following the railroad's completion, the region proved to be unsuited for intensive agricultural use, and by the 1920s Comertown was in decline.

The post office at Comertown operated from November 14, 1914 to June 30, 1957.  A school and a cemetery were also established at Comertown.

In 1993, the entire community was listed on the National Register of Historic Places as a historic district.

Notes

Unincorporated communities in Sheridan County, Montana
Unincorporated communities in Montana
Ghost towns in Montana
Historic districts on the National Register of Historic Places in Montana
National Register of Historic Places in Sheridan County, Montana
Populated places on the National Register of Historic Places in Montana